Șercaia is a commune in Brașov County, Transylvania, Romania. It is composed of three villages: Hălmeag (Halmagen; Halmágy; Halmaç), Șercaia and Vad (Waadt, Waden; Vád). The Hungarian name means "dragon".

The river Șercaia (a left affluent of the Olt) flows south to north through the commune.

Șercaia is situated on European route E68, which connects Brașov to Szeged in Hungary. National Road DN73A runs from Predeal to Șercaia, going along the way through the towns of Râșnov and Zărnești.

The commune also has a small train station that serves the CFR Line 200, which runs from Brașov to Curtici, on the Hungarian border.

At the 2011 census, 84% of inhabitants were Romanians, 10.6% Hungarians, 3.7% Roma and 0.8% Germans.

Natives
 Augustin Bunea (1857–1909), priest and historian
 Alexandru Ciurcu (1854–1922), inventor
 Katalin Varga (1802–aft. 1852), leader of the Transylvanian Miners' Movement

Notes

References 

 
 

Communes in Brașov County
Localities in Transylvania
Burzenland